Kull is a surname.

Notable people with this surname include:
 Brett Kull, American musician
 Caroline Kull, Swedish television host
 Dove Kull, American social worker
 Edward A. Kull, American director
 Edwin Kull, American politician
 Elle Kull, Estonian actress and politician
 John Kull, American baseball player
 Kalevi Kull, Estonian professor of biosemiotics
 Olevi Kull, Estonian professor of ecology
 Raimund Kull, Estonian conductor and composer
 Tiiu Kull, Estonian botanist

References

Estonian-language surnames